Oscar Bernard McBride (born July 23, 1972) is a former American football tight end in the National Football League who played for the Arizona Cardinals. He played college football for the Notre Dame Fighting Irish.

References

1972 births
Living people
American football tight ends
Arizona Cardinals players
Notre Dame Fighting Irish football players